Salha Obeid (Arabic: صالحة عبيد) an Emirati writer and novelist was born in 1988. She published two novels and three short-story collections including "Alzheimers" which was published in 2010 and was translated into German. In 2016, her book "An Implicitly White Lock of Hair" won Al Owais Award for Creative Writing.

Biography 
Salha Obeid is an Emirati writer and novelist who was born on 1988 in the United Arab Emirates. She graduation from the University of Sharjah and earned a bachelor's degree in Electronic engineering. She has published two novels including "Perhaps It’s a Joke" and three short-story collections including "The Postman of Happiness". Obeid published her first short-story collection "Alzheimers" in 2010 and was translated into German a year after its publication. In 2018, she published her first novel "Perhaps It’s a Joke". Obied has won several awards including UAE-Italy Exchange Short Story Award in 2013, Al Owais Award for Creative Writing for her book "An Implicitly White Lock of Hair" in 2016, and the Young Emiratis Prize for her literary work in 2017. Obeid is the founder of the Society of the Intellectual project, a member of the council of the Dubai Culture and Arts Authority, and also the Association of Emirati Women Writers. She is a columnist in an Emirati newspaper "Al Roeya".

Works

Short-story collections 

 "Alzheimers" (original title: Al Zahaimar), 2010
“The Postman of Happiness” (original title: Saee Al Saada), 2011
“An Implicitly White Lock of Hair” (original title: khousla baida bi Shakl Demni), 2015

Novels 

 “iPad: Life in the Manner of Zorba” (original title: Al Haya Ala Tarezat Zorba), 2013
“Perhaps It’s a Joke” (original title: laa’laha Mazha), 2018

Awards 
 2013: Won the UAE-Italy Exchange Short Story Award
 2016: her book “An Implicitly White Lock of Hair” won Al Owais Award for Creative Writing.
 2017: She was awarded the Young Emiratis Prize for Creative Writing Category for her literary work.

See also 
 Lateefa Buti
 Nadia Al Najjar
 Hessa Al Muhairi
 Maryam Saqer Al Qasimi

References 

Living people
1988 births
Emirati writers
Emirati women writers
Emirati novelists